Internetworld was a Swedish magazine focusing on the Internet and business surrounding it.

History and profile
Internetworld was started in 1996. The magazine was owned and published by IDG.

In 1997, Internetworld started an annual ranking of Sweden's 100 best websites, the Topp100. In 2005, it arranged the first Webbdagarna conference. Internetworld ceased publication in 2013, but IDG Sweden has kept the annual Topp100 ranking and Webbdagarna conferences.

References

External links
Internetworld - In Swedish

1996 establishments in Sweden
2013 disestablishments in Sweden
Computer magazines published in Sweden
Defunct computer magazines
Defunct magazines published in Sweden
Magazines established in 1996
Magazines disestablished in 2013
Swedish-language magazines
Magazines about the media